Kottmeier Mesa is a prominent  high mesa,  northwest of Mount J. J. Thomson in the Asgard Range of Victoria Land, Antarctica.

Kottmeier Mesa was named by the Advisory Committee on Antarctic Names (1997) after Steven T. Kottmeier, who as a United States Antarctic Program researcher, 1981–87, investigated sea ice microbial communities in the fast ice of McMurdo Sound, as well as krill associated with ice edge zones in the Bellingshausen, Scotia and Weddell seas. He served as the manager of laboratory facilities at McMurdo Station for ITT Antarctic Services, 1988–90; from 1990 he worked for Antarctic Support Associates, initially as manager of laboratory science, and from 1997 as chief scientist.

References

Mesas of Antarctica
Landforms of Victoria Land
Scott Coast